The 2003 Grand Prix Hassan II was a tennis tournament played on outdoor clay courts at the Complexe Al Amal in Casablanca in Morocco and was part of the International Series of the 2003 ATP Tour. It was the 19th edition of the tournament and was held from 7 April through 13 April 2003. Unseeded Julien Boutter won the singles title.

Finals

Singles

 Julien Boutter defeated  Younes El Aynaoui 6–2, 2–6, 6–1
 It was Boutter's only title of the year and the 5th of his career.

Doubles

 František Čermák /  Leoš Friedl defeated  Devin Bowen /  Ashley Fisher 6–3, 7–5
 It was Čermák's only title of the year and the 3rd of his career. It was Friedl's only title of the year and the 3rd of his career.

External links
 Official website 
 ATP tournament profile

 
Grand Prix Hassan II
Grand Prix Hassan II